Unaporanga is a genus of longhorn beetles of the subfamily Lamiinae, containing the following species:

 Unaporanga cincta Martins & Galileo, 2007
 Unaporanga lanceolata Martins & Galileo, 2007

References

Hemilophini